Giorgos Kastrinakis (alternate spellings: Georgios, George) (Greek: Γιώργος Καστρινάκης) (born June 9, 1950) is a retired Greek American professional basketball player. He played basketball professionally for many years in the Greek Basket League. At 2.04 m tall, he played as a power forward-center. During his basketball playing career, Kastrinakis was mainly known for his spectacular dunking ability.

College career
Kastrinakis played college basketball at American International College, with the Yellow Jackets.

Club career
Kastrinakis was one of two long-time stars on the Olympiacos Piraeus basketball team, along with fellow Greek American Steve Giatzoglou, in the 1970s. With Olympiacos, Kastrinakis won two Greek League championships in 1976 and 1978, as well as four Greek Cups in 1976, 1977, 1978, and 1980. He was the Greek Cup Finals Top Scorer in 1976 and 1980. He also played with Ilysiakos.

National team career
Kastrinakis was one of the stars of the senior Greek national basketball team during the 1970s. With Greece, Kastrinakis played at the EuroBasket 1973, the EuroBasket 1975, the EuroBasket 1979, and the EuroBasket 1981.

Awards and accomplishments

Pro clubs
2× Greek League Champion: (1976, 1978)
4× Greek Cup Winner: (1976, 1977, 1978, 1980)
2× Greek Cup Finals Top Scorer: (1976, 1980)

Greek national team
1979 Mediterranean Games:

References

External links
FIBA Profile
FIBA Europe Profile
Hellenic Basketball Federation Profile 

1950 births
Living people
American International Yellow Jackets men's basketball players
American people of Greek descent
Centers (basketball)
Greek men's basketball players
Greek Basket League players
Ilysiakos B.C. players
Olympiacos B.C. players
Power forwards (basketball)
American men's basketball players
Mediterranean Games medalists in basketball
Mediterranean Games gold medalists for Greece
Competitors at the 1979 Mediterranean Games